Mark Anthony Awere (born 16 July 1971) is a Ghanaian long jumper.

He won bronze medals at the 1998 African Championships and the 1999 All-Africa Games. He also competed at the 2000 Olympic Games.

His personal best jump is 8.04 metres, achieved in June 1999 in Bad Langensalza.

In 2003, Awere tested positive for doping in Mulhouse. He was banned for three months.

References

External links

1971 births
Living people
Ghanaian male long jumpers
Athletes (track and field) at the 1998 Commonwealth Games
Athletes (track and field) at the 2000 Summer Olympics
Olympic athletes of Ghana
Commonwealth Games competitors for Ghana
Doping cases in athletics
Ghanaian sportspeople in doping cases
African Games bronze medalists for Ghana
African Games medalists in athletics (track and field)
Athletes (track and field) at the 1999 All-Africa Games